The Destruction of Sennacherib, is a choral work composed by Modest Mussorgsky (1839–1881), based on text Lord Byron's poem "The Destruction of Sennacherib". It was written between 1866 and 1867, and is dedicated for Mily Balakirev.

See also 
 The Destruction of Sennacherib

Choral compositions
1866 compositions
Compositions by Modest Mussorgsky